Patrick Gamble (born February 2, 1994) is a former American football defensive end. He played college football at Georgia Tech.

Professional career

New York Jets
Gamble signed with the New York Jets as an undrafted free agent on May 5, 2017. He was waived by the Jets on September 2, 2017. He was re-signed to the practice squad on September 4, but released the next day.

Tampa Bay Buccaneers
On November 8, 2017, Gamble was signed to the Tampa Bay Buccaneers' practice squad. He was released on November 14, but was re-signed on November 29, 2017.

References

External links
Georgia Tech Yellow Jackets bio
Tampa Bay Buccaneers bio

1994 births
Living people
American football defensive ends
Georgia Tech Yellow Jackets football players
New York Jets players
Tampa Bay Buccaneers players